Shark Attack 2 is a 2000 direct-to-video horror film. The film follows the mutant sharks from Shark Attack who attack Cape Town. In the film, a shark expert (Thorsten Kaye) and a flamboyant Australian marine hunter (Daniel Alexander) team up to destroy a group of white sharks mutating into a deadlier breed. The film was directed by David Worth and stars Thorsten Kaye and Nikita Ager.

Plot
Dr. Nick Harris (Thorsten Kaye) is a marine biologist hired to deal with the results of an experiment in genetics, a mutated breed of great white sharks have gotten loose on a South African shoreline whilst being transported to an aquarium. The mutant sharks from Dr. Craven's experiments are back, this time choosing Cape Town, South Africa as their hunting ground. Two sisters, Amy (Caroline Bruins) and Samantha Peterson (Nikita Ager), while diving near a wreck in the reef are attacked by a shark; Samantha survives. One week later, Dr. Nick Harris and his assistant get the shark, a 16-footer (4.9 m), and install it as a new attraction at Water World - a Sea World rip-off. When the shark kills a member of the staff and  escapes, Nick and Samantha go to hunt it and discover that there are 6 mutant Great Whites living in a cave near the beach. Along with Nick, they figure the Water World's surfing competition may be attacked by the sharks.

When they bring their worry before the Mayor, however, they are quickly turned away. Roy Bishop (Daniel Alexander) — the Australian shark hunter with the Discovery Channel — is entrusted with taking care of the sharks. Aboard his boat, Down Under, it is revealed he has other plans. He wants to film the sharks for television and kill them some other time. His cameramen Hootie (Rory Atkinson) and Pierson (Anton Vorster) warn him about the dangers of the sharks—even with the use of their protective cages. Bishop teases them with "case of the pussies", after which they capitulate to his plan. The three then enter the shark cages.

Now they team up with Bishop to kill the beasts and save Cape Town. Eventually they succeed in luring the sharks into their cave and blow it up, killing them. Roy is initially believed to have perished but in reality survived.

Cast
 Thorsten Kaye as Dr. Nick Harris
 Daniel Alexander as Roy Bishop
 Nikita Ager as Samantha Peterson
 Caroline Bruins as Amy Peterson
 Danny Keogh as Michael Francisco
 Warrick Grier as Morton
 Morne Visser as Mark Miller
 Alistair Cloete as Tom Miller
 Rory Atkinson as Hootie
 Anton Vorster as Pierson
 Sean Higgs as T.J.
 Ian Jepson as Jeff
 Marc Derman as Kenny
 Stephen Fry as Chuck
 Sean Michaels as News Anchor

Reception
The film has been critically panned. 

G Noel. Gross of DVD Talk gave the film a negative review and said: "As subtle as a kick in the pants. Utterly no concept of suspense. Grossly unoriginal without the benefit of even being amusing -- intentionally, or otherwise".

Popcorn Pictures gave the film 4 out of 10 criticizing the characters and CGI: "You'd assume that I hated Shark Attack II from the overall negative review I've given it here. It's not as bad as I'm making it sound, though that is coming from someone who watches so many low quality films that it's hard to make a valid case for any sane person to watch it. Better than the first one by a fair distance but still coming a long way off being classed as watchable".

Sequel
It was followed by Shark Attack 3: Megalodon in 2002.

References

External links
 
 

2000 films
2000 horror films
2000 direct-to-video films
2000 action films
2000s thriller films
Nu Image films
Shark attacks in fiction
Films about shark attacks
Films about sharks
Direct-to-video sequel films
Films set in Cape Town
Films directed by David Worth (cinematographer)
2000s English-language films